The Life of the Jews in Palestine is a 1913 silent documentary film directed by  depicting Jews and Jewish communities in Ottoman Palestine.  Its production was funded by the Mizrakh Company or the HaMizrah Society of Odessa, Ukraine in the Russian Empire and occurred during a two-month visit of the Russian and Ukrainian filmmakers to Palestine.  Meíron Ossip Grossman was the cinematographer.  It debuted in 1913 at the 11th Zionist Congress in Basel, Switzerland.

Content
Many of the individuals covered in the documentary are Ashkenazi immigrants of the Second Aliyah including Meir Dizengoff, founder and first mayor of Tel Aviv, Russo-Japanese War veteran and subsequent founder of the British Jewish Legion of World War I Joseph Trumpeldor, and Boris Schatz, founder of the Bezalel Academy of Arts and Design, shown teaching an art class.

Production
Sokolovsky was an adherent of Theodor Herzl's Zionist movement and his film promoted the notion "A land without a people for a people without a land" and was a useful means of mobilizing support for the Zionist cause.  The film was criticised by the Zionist left for omitting local Arabs from its portrayal.

Reception
According to Yaacov Davidon, later an Israeli film exhibitor, the film was received with "indescribable enthusiasm" and "Tears of happiness gleamed in the eyes of Jewish audiences, thirsty for redemption."  In Ukraine, the size of thronging crowds viewing the film prompted secret police reports.

Preservation status
Israeli film historian  assisted in the identification.

When screened at the London International Film Festival in 1998 Clyde Jeavons of the British Film Institute said the film was "...one of the most important and enthralling re-discoveries of recent times... Its historical importance, both as an anthropological time capule and as a record of the first modern Jewish immigrations to the Middle East, is self-evident in every rivetingly quotidian scene."  In the evaluation of Dennis Harvey of Variety, writing in 2000, by the era's standards the "photography is exceptional, with well-composed landscape, architectural and medium-to-long-shot crowd views and good occasional use of panoramic pans from elevated points, as well as traveling perspectives from train and boat."

References

External links

The Life of the Jews in Palestine at the Jewish Film Institute
Life of the Jews of Palestine at Kinomania.ru (in Russian)

1910s rediscovered films
1913 documentary films
1913 films
Aliyah
Articles containing video clips
Black-and-white documentary films
Documentary films about Jews and Judaism
Films of the Russian Empire
Films shot in Palestine (region)
Jews and Judaism in Ottoman Palestine
Jews and Judaism in Ottoman Galilee
Rediscovered Russian films
Russian black-and-white films
Russian documentary films
Russian silent films
Rediscovered Ukrainian films
Ukrainian black-and-white films
Ukrainian documentary films
Ukrainian silent films